Sir Courtney Terrell (1881—17 May 1938) was a British Indian Judge and former Chief Justice of the Patna High Court.

Career 
Terrell was born in 1881. He was the eldest son of Thomas Terrell, KC and Emma Terrell. He became the Judge of the Calcutta High Court thereafter on 31 March 1928, he was transferred as the Chief Justice of Patna High Court, stayed in the post for ten years almost until his death. Sir Courtney Terrell was known and respected for his legal decisions and his love of the Indian people. Terrell visited Japan during his judgeship. He died in 1938 from abdominal cancer. His son Richard Terrell wrote a book The Chief Justice describing his life in British India.

References 

1881 births
1938 deaths
British India judges
20th-century Indian judges
Judges of the Calcutta High Court
Chief Justices of the Patna High Court
Knights Bachelor
Members of Gray's Inn
British people in colonial India